Cumann na mBan (literally "The Women's Council" but calling themselves The Irishwomen's Council in English), abbreviated C na mB, is an Irish republican women's paramilitary organisation formed in Dublin on 2 April 1914, merging with and dissolving Inghinidhe na hÉireann, and in 1916, it became an auxiliary of the Irish Volunteers. Although it was otherwise an independent organisation, its executive was subordinate to that of the Irish Volunteers, and later, the Irish Republican Army.

They were active in the War of Independence and took the anti-Treaty side in the Civil War. Cumann na mBan were declared an illegal organisation by the government of the Irish Free State in 1923. This was reversed when Fianna Fáil came to power in 1932. During the splits in the Republican movement of the later part of the 20th century, Fianna Éireann and Cumann na mBan supported Provisional Sinn Féin in 1969 and Republican Sinn Féin in 1986.

Foundation

In 1913, a number of women decided to hold a meeting in Wynn's Hotel, Dublin, for the purpose of discussing the possibility of forming an organisation for women who would work in conjunction with the recently formed Irish Volunteers. A meeting chaired by Agnes O'Farrelly on 2 April 1914 marked the foundation of Cumann na mBan. Branches, which pledged to the Constitution of the organisation, were formed throughout the country and were directed by the Provisional Committee. The first branch was named the Ard Chraobh, which held their meetings in Brunswick Street before and after the 1916 Easter Rising.

Aims

The constitution of Cumann na mBan contained explicit references to the use of force by arms if necessary. At the time the Government of Ireland Bill 1914 was being debated and might have had to be enforced in Ulster. The primary aims of the organisation as stated in its constitution were to "advance the cause of Irish liberty and to organize Irishwomen in the furtherance of this object", to "assist in arming and equipping a body of Irish men for the defence of Ireland" and to "form a fund for these purposes, to be called 'The Defence of Ireland Fund'".

Membership

In addition to their local subscriptions (i.e. involvement in other nationalist associations or organisations), members of Cumann na mBan were expected to support the Defence of Ireland Fund, through subscription or otherwise. Its recruits were from diverse backgrounds, mainly white-collar workers and professional women, but with a significant proportion also from the working class. In September 1914, the Irish Volunteers split over John Redmond's appeal for its members to enlist in the British Army. The majority of Cumann na mBan members supported the rump of between 10,000 and 14,000 volunteers who rejected this call and who retained the original name, the Irish Volunteers. A few Cumann na mBan branches affiliated directly to Redmond's National Volunteers; other ex-members joined short-lived Redmondite associations, like the Volunteer Aid Association, or the "Women's National Council" formed by Bridget Dudley Edwards in 1915.

Role in the 1916 Easter Rising

On 23 April 1916, when the Military Council of the Irish Republican Brotherhood finalised arrangements for the Easter Rising, it integrated Cumann na mBan, along with the Irish Volunteers and Irish Citizen Army, into the 'Army of the Irish Republic'. Patrick Pearse was appointed Commandant-General and James Connolly Commandant-General of the Dublin Division.

On the day of the Rising, Cumann na mBan members, including Winifred Carney, who arrived armed with both a Webley revolver and a typewriter, entered the General Post Office on O'Connell Street in Dublin with their male counterparts.  By nightfall, women insurgents were established in all the major rebel strongholds throughout the city  except Boland's Mill and the South Dublin Union held by Éamon de Valera and Eamonn Ceannt.

The majority of the women worked as Red Cross workers, couriers or procured rations for the men.  Members also gathered intelligence on scouting expeditions, carried despatches and transferred arms from dumps across the city to insurgent strongholds.

Some members of Cumann na mBan were also members of the Citizen Army and as such were combatants in the Rising. Constance Markievicz is said to have shot and killed a policeman at St Stephen's Green during the opening phase of the hostilities. She carried out sniper attacks on British troops and with Mary Hyland and Lily Kempson, was among a small force under Frank Robbins which occupied the College of Surgeons opposite the Green and failed to retrieve rifles that were believed to be held there by the college's Officer Training Corps. Helena Molony was among the Citizen Army company which attacked Dublin Castle and subsequently occupied the adjacent City Hall, where she and other women sniped.

At the Four Courts the women of Cumann na mBan helped to organise the evacuation of buildings at the time of surrender and to destroy incriminating papers. More typical was the General Post Office (GPO), where Pearse insisted that most of them (excluding Carney, who refused to leave the injured James Connolly) leave at noon on Friday, 28 April.  The building was then coming under shell- and machine-gun fire and many casualties were anticipated. The following day the leaders at the GPO decided to negotiate surrender. Pearse asked Cumann na mBan member Elizabeth O'Farrell (a mid-wife at the National Maternity Hospital) to act as a go-between.  Under British military supervision she brought Pearse's surrender order to the rebel units still fighting in Dublin.  Over 70 women, including many of the leading figures in Cumann na mBan, were arrested after the insurrection and many of the women who had been captured fighting were imprisoned in Kilmainham; all but twelve had been released by 8 May 1916.

After the Rising
 
Revitalized after the Rising and led by Countess Markievicz, Cumann na mBan took a leading role in popularising the memory of the 1916 leaders, organising prisoner relief agencies and later in opposing conscription and internment. Cumann na mBan members canvassed for Sinn Féin in the 1918 general election, in which Countess Markievicz was elected Teachta Dála. Jailed at the time, she became the Minister for Labour of the Irish Republic from 1919 to 1922. During the Anglo-Irish War, its members were active. They hid arms and provided safe houses for volunteers, helped run the Dáil Courts and local authorities, and in the production of the Irish Bulletin, official newspaper of the Irish Republic. In the Irish elections of May 1921, Markievicz was joined by fellow Cumann na mBan members Mary MacSwiney, Ada English and Kathleen Clarke as Teachtaí Dála.

The Treaty

On 7 January 1922 the Anglo-Irish Treaty was approved by the Second Dáil by a close vote of 64–57. On 5 February a convention was held to discuss this, and 419 Cumann na mBan members voted against as opposed to 63 in favour. In the ensuing Civil War, its members largely supported the anti-Treaty Republican forces. Over 400 of its members were imprisoned by the forces of the Provisional government which became in December 1922 the Irish Free State. Some of those who supported the Treaty changed the name of their branches to Cumann na Saoirse, while others retained their name but gave allegiance to the Free State Government.

After the Treaty
Cumann na mBan continued to exist after the Treaty, forming (alongside Sinn Féin, the Irish Republican Army, Fianna Éireann and other groups) part of the Irish republican milieu. The government of the Irish Free State banned the organisation in January 1923 and opened up Kilmainham Jail as a detention prison for suspect women.

In February 1923, 23 women members of Cumann na mBan went on hunger strike for 34 days over the arrest and imprisonment without trial of Irish republican prisoners (see 1923 Irish Hunger Strikes). That strike resulted in the release of the women hunger-strikers. In March 1923, 97 women went on hunger strike in Kilmainham Gaol after all of their privileges had been denied without explanation (that hunger strike ended later in the month with the restoration of privileges).

Its membership strength was adversely affected by the many splits in Irish republicanism, with sections of the membership resigning to join Fianna Fáil, Clann na Poblachta and other parties. Máire Comerford, a lifelong member from 1914, reflected in later years that it became a 'greatly weakened organisation' that 'gathered speed downhill' from the founding of Fianna Fáil in 1926.

What strength the organisation had left after 1926 was sapped again when post-1926 president Eithne Coyle repeatedly tried to resign in the late 1930s during World War II in protest against the Sabotage Campaign being waged by the IRA. Coyle objected to the IRA bombing British industrial targets in Northern Ireland and England due to risks posed to civilians. Her resignation was rejected by Cumann na mBan several times before they eventually conceded in 1941.

Deaths of Cumann na mBan members

Josephine McGowan died as a result of a beating by police at an anti internment rally in Dublin on 22 September 1918.
Margaret Keogh, aged 19, was killed on 10 July 1921 (the night before the Truce came into effect). She was trying to remove arms from her home in Irishtown, Dublin, while Black and Tan raids were being carried out. One of the bullets fell in the fire, exploded, and hit her, fatally wounding her. She was the only Cumann na mBan member to be killed in the War of Independence. 
Margaret McAnaney was accidentally shot dead by an IRA Volunteer at Burnfoot, County Donegal on 31 May 1922.
On that same day Margaret McElduff died of an accidental gunshot wound in County Tyrone.
On 4 August 1922 Mary Hartney died as a result of an Irish Free State Army artillery barrage in the town of Adare, County Limerick.
On 18 November 1922 Lily Bennett was shot and killed at a Republican Prisoners Defense Committee public rally on O'Connell Street, Dublin. 
On 8 April 1923 a Free State soldier shot and killed Cumann na mBan member Margaret "Maggie" Dunne (aged 26) in Adrigole, West Cork, in an apparent act of reprisal.
Annie Hogan from Cratloe, County Clare died as a result of a hunger strike in Kilmainham jail. She had been released in September 1923 and died a short time later.

Present day

Cumann na mBan supported the Provisional wing in the 1969/70 split in the IRA and Sinn Féin. Sinn Féin vice-president and leading Cumann na mBan member Máire Drumm was shot dead by loyalists in 1976. In Northern Ireland Cumann na mBan was integrated into the mainstream Irish Republican Army during the conflict, although the organisation continued to exist.

In 1986, Cumann na mBan opposed the decision by the IRA and Sinn Féin to drop the policy of abstentionism and aligned itself with Republican Sinn Féin and the Continuity IRA. In 1996, RSF general secretary and Cumann na mBan member Josephine Hayden was jailed for six years on charges relating to the possession of a sawn-off shotgun and a revolver.

In 2014 Cumann na mBan celebrated the Centenary of their foundation in Wynn's Hotel, Dublin, where they were founded in 1914.

Cumann na mBan is a proscribed organisation in the United Kingdom under the Terrorism Act 2000, but it is not listed as a Foreign Terrorist Organization by the United States.

The documentary "Cumann na mBan: The Women's Army" (2019) offers historical and contemporary information on the organization: http://www.ulib.iupui.edu/video/CumannnamBan .

Presidents

Other prominent members

Regional founder
 Kathleen Balfe

Notes

References

Sources

 
 Anonymous, 'Cumann na mBan in Easter Week: Tribute from a Hostile Source', Wolfe Tone Annual, undated.
 Boylan, Henry, (ed.), A Dictionary of Irish Biography (Dublin 1999).
 Coxhead, Elizabeth, Daughters of Erin (Gerrard's Cross 1985).
 Daly, Madge, 'Gallant Cumann na mBan of Limerick', in Limerick Fighting Story 1916-1921 (Kerry 1948), p. 201-5.
 Fallon, Charlotte, 'Civil War Hungerstrikes: Women and Men', Eire, vol.22, 1987.
 McCarthy, Cal, Cumann na mBan and the Irish Revolution (Dublin 2007)
 McKillen, Beth, 'Irish Feminism and National Separatism, 1914-23' Eire-Ireland 17 (1982).
 Markievicz, Countess Constance, Cumann na mBan 11, no.10, 1926.
 Meehan, Helen, 'Ethna Carbery: Anna Johnston McManus', Donegal Annual, No.45, 1993.
 O'Daly, Nora, 'Cumann na mBan in Stephens' Green and in the College of Surgeons', An t-Oglach, April 1926.
 Reynolds, M, 'Cumann na mBan in the GPO', An t-Oglach, (March 1926).
 Ui Chonail, Eilis Bean, 'A Cummann na mBan recalls Easter Week', The Capuchin Annual, 1996.
 Ward, Margaret, 'Marginality and Militancy: Cumann na mBan, 1914-1936', in Austen Morgan and Bob Purdie (eds.), Ireland: Divided Nation, Divided Class (London 1980).

External links
The Irish Revolutionary Women of Cumann na mBan
Gone But Not Forgotten

 
Irish republican militant groups
Organisations designated as terrorist by the United Kingdom
Organizations based in Europe designated as terrorist
All-female military units and formations